Monte Bryan Money is an American guitarist and vocalist from Las Vegas, Nevada. He is the former lead guitarist and backing vocalist of American rock band Escape the Fate. He is currently the lead singer and guitarist for his own band, Beyond Unbroken with his brother Michael Money.

Career

Escape the Fate (2004–2013)

Monte Money was the lead guitarist of Escape the Fate. He has released four albums with the band and is one of the founding members.

On September 16, 2013, Escape the Fate issued a statement from their Facebook page stating that Monte and his brother had refused to go on the "Wrong Side of Heaven" tour with Five Finger Death Punch, and that they would be replacing them for the tour. Along with this announcement, line up changes were also mentioned. TJ Bell would move from the being the bassist to the rhythm guitarist. Former bassist and founding member Max Green would be returning to the band for the tour. It was later announced in an Alternative Press video featuring lead singer Craig Mabbitt that Max Green would be returning to bass permanently, and Kevin Gruft would become the new lead guitarist.

Monte later issued a statement, "Over the past few weeks, I have become aware of the mis-truths being told by Craig Mabbitt over Twitter, Facebook, and various entertainment sites about my role with Escape the Fate. As ETF fans know, I spent many years of my life completely devoted to the band, and never worked harder at anything to achieve its success." He mentions the band's advisors have been saying that Escape the Fate is bankrupt.

Beyond Unbroken (2013–present)

After leaving Escape the Fate, Monte and his brother Michael have started a new solo project called Money Brothers. Monte says “After a great decade in the band and working with the guys, I just felt like I wanted to start a new journey and explore a new musical path. I will always love what we've created and all of the crazy fun times the guys and I had". They only released two singles. their first single titled "Break Free" was released in October 2013. and Their second single titled "Clarity (Behind the Curtain)" was released in February 2014.

Monte had revealed a name change from the solo project Money Brothers to a new band called Beyond Unbroken.

On October 30, 2015, their new single titled "Under Your Skin" was released.

On February 22, 2016, the single "Dont Wake the Dead" was released. On March 30, 2016, The band released their first music video for the single "Losing My Mind" debuting on Alternative Press.

On August 29, 2017, after over a year after the release of "Losing My Mind" the band released a new single entitled "Overdose" accompanied by an animated video. On September 1, 2017, the band's debut EP "Don't Wake the Dead" was released.

On February 7, 2020, the band released two singles titled "Enemy" and "In My Head". On April 3, 2020, the band's debut album "Running Out of Time" was released.

Gear

 Ibanez S5470F Prestige (seen in Picture Perfect, You're Insane, and This War Is Ours music videos)
 Gibson Les Paul Standard (black, stock pickups) (seen in Not Good Enough For Cliche, The Flood, and Something music videos)
 Gibson Les Paul Custom (black, stock pickups) (Used by his brother, Michael Money, in Ungrateful music video)
 Dean Razorback V (Black) (seen in Situations music video)
 Ibanez Prestige RGD seven string (drop A) (Floyd Rose) (seen in Ungrateful, City of Sin, and Issues music videos)
 Peavey Wolfgang
 Ibanez Halberd (black with Ibanez Edge bridge) (seen in Gorgeous Nightmare)

Discography

with Escape the Fate
Escape the Fate (EP) (2005)
There's No Sympathy for the Dead (EP) (2006)
Dying Is Your Latest Fashion (2006)
Situations (EP) (2007) 
This War Is Ours (2008)
Escape the Fate (2010)
Ungrateful (2013)

with Money BrothersBreak Free (Single, 2013)Clarity (Behind the Curtain) (Single, 2014)

with Beyond UnbrokenDon't Wake the Dead (EP) (2017)Running Out of Time (2020)
Collaborations
"On Top of the World" by The Dead Rabbitts (Edge of Reality (EP), 2012)
 "Offline" and "Lost in Space" by Paul Bartolome (Gravity, 2018)
 "Devils In the Details" by Paul Bartolome (Screaming Through the Radio'', 2020)

References

External links

 Monte Money on Twitter

Living people
Escape the Fate members
Lead guitarists
1986 births
Guitarists from Nevada
Musicians from Las Vegas